Rampur-Sahaswan gharana is a gharana (musical heritage) of Hindustani classical music centred in the North-Uttar Pradesh towns of Rampur and Sahaswan. Ustad Inayat Hussain Khan (1849–1919) was the founder of this gharana.

History
The gharana find its origins in Mehboob Khan, the chief khayal singer in the royal court of Rampur State (in present Uttar Pradesh), his tradition was followed by his son Inayat Hussain Khan (1849–1919) and in turn by Inyat's brothers-in-law, Haider Khan (1857–1927), Ustad Fida Hussain Khan and Padma Bhushan Ustad Mushtaq Hussain Khan (1878–1964; first recipient of the Padma Bhushan Award), thus all the singers were connected with each other, and gharana was named after their ancestral place, Sahaswan, in present Badaun district. Amongst most famous and relevant vocalists of the Gharana are Mushtaq Hussain Khan, Nissar Hussain Khan,  Ghulam Mustafa Khan, Ghulam Sadiq Khan and  Rashid Khan.

Inayat Hussain Khan was a child prodigy.

Singing style
The Rampur-Sahaswan gayaki (style of singing) is closely related to the Gwalior Gharana, which features medium-slow tempos, a full-throated voice and intricate rhythmic play. The gharana style is also known for the diversity and intricacy of the taans (rapidfire elaborations), as well as tarana singing.

Renowned singers of this gharana include the first and, perhaps the foremost disciple of Inayat Hussain Khan, Haider Khan. Khan and his family play a vital role in upbringing the legacy of this illustrious family. His son Fida Hussain Khan and his grandson Nissar Hussain Khan continued the tradition.

Nissar Hussain Khan was a great teacher whose disciples include vocalists Ghulam Mustafa Khan, Rashid Khan, Hafeez Ahmed Khan. Mushtaq Hussain Khan was a disciple of Hyder Khan and was later groomed by Inayat Hussain Khan. He was the recipient of the first Padma Bhushan award in singing.

The gharana is represented by two interrelated families - the direct descendants of Inayat Hussain Khan and his other relatives and disciples.

In 2006, Dr Sakuntala Narasimhan, herself a disciple of Hafeez Ahmed Khan, published a book on the Rampur-Sahaswan gharana titled The Splendour of Rampur-Sahaswan Gharana.

Exponents

19th Century

 Haider Khan (1857-1927), son and disciple of Ali Bux Khan.
 Inayat Hussain Khan (1849–1919), son and disciple of Mehboob Khan Bakhsh. Also learned from Bahadur Hussain Khan (Senia Gharana of Rampur) and Haddu Khan of Gwalior.
 Mushtaq Hussain Khan (1878–1964), son and disciple of Kallan Khan. Also learned from older brother, Ashiq Hussain Khan, father-in-law Inayat Hussain Khan, and Wazir Khan.

20th Century

 Arun Bhaduri (1943-2018), disciple of Ishtiaq Hussain Khan.
 Sulochana Brahaspati (b. 1937), disciple of Mushtaq Hussain Khan.
 Naina Devi (1917-1993), disciple of Mushtaq Hussain Khan.
 Bhimsen Joshi (1922-2011), disciple of Mushtaq Hussain Khan. More associated with Kirana Gharana.
 Ghulam Abid Khan, son and disciple of Mushtaq Hussain Khan.
 Ghulam Hussain Khan (b. 1936), son and disciple of Mushtaq Hussain Khan.
 Ghulam Mustafa Khan (1931-2021), son and disciple of Waris Hussain Khan. Also learned from father-in-law, Mushtaq Hussain Khan.
 Ghulam Sadiq Khan , son and disciple of Ghulam Jaffar Khan. Son-in-law and disciple of Mushtaq Hussain Khan.
 Hafeez Ahmed Khan (1926-2006), son and disciple of Rashid Ahmed Khan. Also learned from Mushtaq Hussain Khan.
 Nissar Hussain Khan (1909–1993), son and disciple of Fida Hussain Khan.
 Shanno Khurana (b. 1927), disciple of Mushtaq Hussain Khan.
 Sumati Mutatkar (1916-2007), disciple of Mushtaq Hussain Khan.

21st Century

 Tushar Dutta (b. 1969), disciple of Arun Bhaduri.
   # Shirin Sengupta Nath ( b.1973), disciple of Pandit Arun Bhaduri.

References

Bibliography

External links
 Rampur Sahaswan Gharana at ITC Sangeet Research Academy

Vocal gharanas
Rampur, Uttar Pradesh
Music of Uttar Pradesh